Calotingis is a genus of lace bugs in the family Tingidae. There are at least two described species in Calotingis.

Species
These two species belong to the genus Calotingis:
 Calotingis knighti Drake, 1918
 Calotingis subopaca (Hacker, 1928)

References

Further reading

 
 
 
 

Tingidae
Articles created by Qbugbot